Nyssodesmus is a genus of flat-backed millipedes in the family Platyrhacidae. About a dozen species have been described, all native to Central America, occurring from Nicaragua to Panama.

Species
Nyssodesmus alboalatus
Nyssodesmus antius 
Nyssodesmus attemsi
Nyssodesmus concolor 
Nyssodesmus fraternus
Nyssodesmus limonensis
Nyssodesmus luteolus
Nyssodesmus mimus 
Nyssodesmus nicaraguanus 
Nyssodesmus python
Nyssodesmus tristani 
Nyssodesmus vialis

References

Polydesmida
Millipedes of Central America